The discography of Anna Abreu, a Finnish pop, R&B and dance singer, consists of six studio albums, one compilation album, sixteen singles, two B-sides, and eight music videos on RCA Records and Warner Bros. Records. To date, Abreu has sold over 190,000 certified records in Finland.

Studio albums

Compilation albums

Singles

Other appearances

Music videos

References

Pop music discographies
Discographies of Finnish artists